The Xbox 360 video game console is subject to a number of technical problems and failures that can render it unusable. However, many of the issues can be identified by a series of glowing red lights flashing on the face of the console; the three flashing red lights (nicknamed the "Red Ring of Death" or the "RRoD") being the most infamous. There are also other issues that arise with the console, such as discs becoming scratched in the drive and "bricking" of consoles due to dashboard updates. Since its release on November 22, 2005, many articles have appeared in the media portraying the Xbox 360's failure rates, with the latest estimate by warranty provider SquareTrade to be 23.7% in 2009, and currently the highest estimate being 54.2% by a Game Informer survey.

There has been legal action taken attempting to hold Microsoft responsible for the Xbox 360's failure rate and provide compensation for those affected.

General Hardware Failure errors

Three flashing red lights around the Xbox 360 power button instead of the one to four green lights indicating normal operation represent an internal problem that requires service. This error was soon nicknamed the "Red Ring of Death", echoing Windows' Blue Screen of Death error.  Warning signs may include freeze-ups, graphical problems in the middle of gameplay, such as checkerboard or pinstripe patterns on the screen, and sound errors; mostly consisting of extremely loud noises that can be affected by the volume control, the console only responding when the power button is pressed to turn it off. These events may happen once or several times until the hardware failure occurs, or not at all. If the console freezes occasionally, the error will not necessarily follow. The technical problems seem to affect some generations of consoles more than others, such as the Xenon or Zephyr. Those problems may also cause some freezing screens.

This error code is usually caused by the failure of one or more hardware components, although it can indicate that the console is not receiving enough power from the power supply, which can either be due to a faulty power supply or if the power supply cable is not fully inserted into the console. The 3 flashing lights can also be caused by power surges; if the console is connected to an outlet that receives a power surge, it may have a failure and the 3 lights will appear as long as the console is plugged into the outlet.  Turning off the console, unplugging all power cables and plugging them back in, and restarting the console may fix this issue in some cases.

Distinct from the General Hardware Failure is a similar-looking, but much less serious, error warning where four red lights appear, in which case the console does not detect an AV cable is plugged in; however, this error code is not generated on models equipped with an HDMI output. While the main cause is the AV cable, in rare cases, the 4 lights can mean a serious problem with the console. When the 4 lights indicate a serious issue, it is followed by a 2-digit error code, similar to what will with 1 ring. The four lights can sometimes also be seen when power surges or very brief power outages occur while the console is running, in which the console needs to be unplugged and plugged back in again to reset the error. Two red lights appear when the system is overheated.

On the Xbox 360 S and E models, the power button utilizes a different design that does not incorporate the same style of lighting that past models used. A flashing red light means that the console is overheating, similar to the two-light error code on the original model Xbox 360; however, an on-screen message also appears, telling the user that the console will automatically power off to protect itself from overheating. A solid red light is similar to the one-light error if an "E XX" error message is displayed and a three-light error code if the error message is absent.

Response to rate of failure
In the early months after the console's launching, Microsoft stated that the Xbox 360's failure rate was within the consumer electronics industry's typical 3% to 5%.  Nevertheless, Microsoft has not released its official statistics on the failure rate of the various versions of the console.

On July 5, 2007, Peter Moore, the Vice President of Microsoft's Interactive Entertainment Business division published an open letter recognizing the console's problems, as well as announcing a three-year warranty from the original date of purchase for every Xbox 360 console that experiences the "general hardware failure" indicated by three flashing red LEDs on the console. A source that has been identified as a team leader and key architect in the creation of the Xbox and Xbox 360 and a founding member of the Xbox team provided insight as to the high rate of failures. The interviews suggest that Xbox 360 units that fail early in their life do so because of problems in the system design, parts supply, material reliability, and manufacturing issues as well as a system not tolerant to faults. These issues were alleged to be the end results of the decisions of management in Microsoft's Xbox team and inadequate testing resources prior to the console's release. A second source cited that, at one time, there was just a 32% yield of one of the test production runs. 68 of every 100 test units were found to be defective.

Years after leaving Microsoft, Moore recalled preparing to tell the CEO of Microsoft, Steve Ballmer, of his planned response to the incident, "we've got to tell Steve, here's what we have to do: we need to FedEx an empty box to a customer who had a problem - they would call us up - with a FedEx return label to send your box, and then we would FedEx it back to them and fix it. ...  I always remember $240m of that was FedEx. ... It was sickening. I was doing a lot of interviews. ... We couldn't figure it out. ... There was a theory. We had changed our solder, which is the way you put the GPU and the fans, to lead-free. ... We think it was somehow the heat coming off the GPU was drying out some of the solder, and it wasn't the normal stuff we'd used, because we had to meet European Standards and take the lead out. ... He said, 'what's it going to cost?' I remember taking a deep breath, looking at Robbie, and saying, 'we think it's $1.15bn, Steve.' He said, 'do it.' There was no hesitation. ... If we hadn't made that decision there and then, and tried to fudge over this problem, then the Xbox brand and Xbox One wouldn't exist today."

On February 8, 2008, during the Game Developers Conference 2008, Microsoft announced that the "Failure rate has officially dropped", but without mentioning any specifics. The same month, electronics warranty provider SquareTrade published an examination of 1040 Xbox 360s and said that they suffered from a failure rate of 16.4% (one in six). Of the 171 failures, 60% were due to a general hardware failure (and thus fell under the 3 year extended warranty). And of the remaining 40% which were not covered by the extended warranty, 18% were disc read errors, 13% were video card failures, 13% were hard drive freezes, 10% were power issues and 7% were disc tray malfunctions.  SquareTrade also stated that its estimates are likely significantly lower than reality due to the time span of the sample (six to ten months), the eventual failure of many consoles that did not occur within this time span and the fact that most owners did not deal with SquareTrade and had their consoles repaired directly through Microsoft via the much publicized extended RROD warranty.

People who experience the problem will find that they have to send the Xbox 360 away for repair or replacement and it may take up to 3 weeks to repair or replace. During the time of the Xbox being replaced, Microsoft and UPS will keep the client(s) updated with the current status of where the Xbox is and whether it is being repaired or replaced.

On October 17, 2008 a class action lawsuit was filed in California against Microsoft over the RROD problem.

On August 28, 2009, SquareTrade published a report saying that "early indications point to the RROD problem abating in 2009", projecting that 1-year failure rates with the release of the Jasper chipsets might be below 4%, with actual fail rates for RROD problems at slightly above 1% in Q109, and total failure rates for all hardware problems at about 12%.

In June 2010, Microsoft released a new "slimmer" Xbox 360. These models indicate hardware failure differently from the original; The outer ring segments cannot turn red anymore. Microsoft has said that henceforth errors will be displayed by the center of the power button changing from green to red. Additionally, Microsoft will no longer give a 3-year warranty for "general failure" errors, because the Xbox 360 slim "constitutes a whole new design".

Causes

Until December 13, 2021, the official cause of the problem was not revealed by Microsoft, leading third parties to make many different theories about what the exact cause of the problem was.

Electronics industry newspaper EE Times reported that the problems may have started in the graphics chip. Microsoft designed the chip in-house to cut out the traditional ASIC vendor with the goal of saving money in ASIC design costs. After multiple product failures, Microsoft went back to an ASIC vendor and had the chip redesigned so it would dissipate less heat.

German computer magazine c't blamed the problem primarily on the use of the wrong type of lead-free solder, a type that when exposed to elevated temperatures for extended periods of time becomes brittle and can develop hair-line cracks that are almost irreparable. The article also revealed that representatives of the three largest Xbox 360 resellers in the world (EB Games, GameStop, and Best Buy) claimed that the failure rate of the Xbox 360 was between 30% and 33%, and that Micromart, the largest repair shop in the United Kingdom, stopped repairing Xbox 360s because it was unable to fully repair the defective systems. Because of the nature of the problem, Micromart could only make temporary repairs, which led to many of the "repaired" systems failing again after a few weeks.  At that time Micromart was receiving 2,500 defective consoles per day from the U.K. alone.

Some articles also suggested that the hardware condition may also be caused by using the new Xbox Kinect with the old Xenon generation Xbox.

On December 13, 2021, as part of a 6-part documentary on the history of Xbox, Microsoft revealed that it determined the red-ring issue to be caused by the cracking of solder joints inside the GPU flip chip package, connecting the GPU die to the substrate interposer, as a result of thermal stress from heating up and cooling back down when the system is power cycled.

Scratched discs

Almost at the same time the Xbox 360 was released in late 2005, customers began reporting circumferential scratches found on discs used in their Xbox 360 consoles.  Almost two years later, in February 2007, the web site "The Llamma's Adventures" investigated the matter and concluded that some Xbox 360 disc drives lack a mechanism to secure the disc solidly in place. Tilting or moving consoles with these drives, when operating with a disc spinning inside, can potentially cause damage to the disc and in some cases rendering the disc unplayable as a result. Discs have also been scratched by stationary consoles during normal use. One side of the disc can also be scratched by the disc tray if it malfunctions by closing with the disc in an odd position. Also, technical engineers already knew about the problem before release confirm this with Microsoft with a list of solutions. According to Microsoft, decreasing the disc rotation would cause games to take excessive amounts of time to load from the disc, and adding a bumper in the disc tray would cost 25 cents per console—a total of about 11 million dollars and causing a delay of the Xbox 360 release. In 2005, they were accused of many technical Xbox 360 problems and a poor lack of solutions and warranty. According to reports in news media, the new Xbox 360 S design still scratches discs when the console is moved while spinning in operation. However, the Xbox 360 S and Xbox 360 E shipped with a sticker informing users that moving the console while powered on poses risks, effectively removing legal responsibility from Microsoft.

Disc replacement

Although discs scratched by the Xbox 360 are not covered under its warranty, Microsoft's Xbox Disc Replacement Program will sell customers a new copy of discs scratched by the Xbox 360, if they are published in countries where the Xbox was originally sold, at a cost of $20. The published list of games that qualify, however, is limited. Halo 3 Limited Edition was replaced at no cost until February 1, 2008 according to the Xbox Disc Replacement Program's main site.  Other publishers can be contacted directly for a disc exchange, but it is unclear whether they will replace discs at no cost. Game publisher Electronic Arts details a specific program for this problem which requires the disc and original receipt, with the requirement that the game must be purchased within 90 days of the request for a replacement disc, or they will request a replacement charge of $20 or $25.

In December 2005 (shortly after the Xbox 360's release in the United States and Canada on November 22, 2005 and around its release in Europe and Asia in early December 2005), reports of unidentifiable noises from the Xbox 360 were appearing on Internet message boards. In response to the problem, Microsoft offered in December 2005 to replace only the Perfect Dark Zero video game "even if it was not the game that was scratched." The scratched disc problem reportedly affected only a small percentage of Xbox 360 units, however it became apparent in December 2005, through message board reports and growing media coverage.

Kassa’s February 2007 investigation
The Xbox 360 scratched disc problem received little media coverage in 2006;<ref>But see, Godinez, Victor. (March 25, 2006) Dallas Morning News Over the top: Texas Gamer with Victor Godinez - Xbox 360 troubles. Section: Guidelive; Page 2G.</ref> however, in February 2007, the Dutch television program Kassa investigated several complaints from Dutch consumers about circular scratches made in their Xbox 360 discs. Some of these consumers claimed that their discs became unreadable. Kassa investigation traced the problem to a design defect in which the Xbox 360 optical lens was not restrained sufficiently.Kassa (February 24, 2007) English subtitled fragment from the first Kassa broadcast about the circular scratches.  (republished by Google Video). Retrieved April 15, 2007. In asserting that Microsoft or at least its chain of suppliers was aware of this problem, Kassa noted that Microsoft's "TSST" versions of the Samsung DVD-drive lack rubber cushions around the optical lens while identical Samsung drives sold for PCs did have these rubber cushions. Kassa also noted that the affected Xbox 360s all seem to have been produced towards the end of 2006.

Kassa’s April 2007 investigation
During the February 2007 investigation report, Kassa stated that either not all Xbox 360s without protective pads would spontaneously scratch discs, or that the complaints were from Xbox 360 users who had moved their Xbox during use, or who used an unstable setup. Kassa's February 2007 investigation left open the question of whether consumers contributed to the rounded scratch problem by moving their Xbox 360 (TSST version) during the playing of a disc. This resulted in Kassa receiving an additional 1,000 complaints over the subsequent two months, with many consumers denying the Xbox had moved when the scratching occurred, or that it had been placed in an unstable position.

Prompted by consumer reaction to its February 2007 report, Kassa performed several tests with Xbox 360 units from consumers who claimed their Xbox had the problem. Kassa stabilized these consoles and positioned them at a location remote from contact by anyone. The results of the laboratory conditions test revealed that one of the nine tested Xbox 360 units had spontaneously scratched a disc after five hours of gaming. The consoles were also tested standing upright, and the test revealed that three of the nine tested Xbox 360s significantly scratched discs.  The video of the complete investigation, meticulously documenting the methodology, and all the relevant details of the tests, was made ready to be aired on April 14, 2007. The videos are also distributed with English subtitles, for those that are not Dutch (Note that Kassa has produced and uploaded these videos itself, and therefore it is not a copyright violation to reproduce these links here. They can also be found on Kassa's website together with some press information about the case.) The test setup details can be found online, and the complete movie of the Kassa TV program meticulously documenting the methodology used for the test can be found online (in Dutch)  Weeks before it aired, however, Kassa solicited input from Microsoft Netherlands.

One day before the airing of the April 14, 2007 show, Kassa received a response from Microsoft Netherlands stating that "as a result of regular use it is possible that scratches on discs can arise", and that Microsoft Netherlands "would seek a solution for the Dutch customers with this problem".  Additionally, Microsoft released the following statement ten days after the show, on April 24, 2007:

Microsoft Netherlands now accepts these complaints from users (while within the warranty period), and offers to replace the Xbox 360 free of charge. Whether Microsoft Netherlands will also replace scratched discs is still unclear. After the official broadcast, (in a continuation of the show which can be viewed on-line, about 28 minutes into the show) a customer is shown calling the Microsoft help-desk, who is told Microsoft will replace his Xbox 360 but is denied a promise to replace his scratched games. There are reports from some other regions that Microsoft will replace scratched discs if published by Microsoft.

The European Commission’s June 2007 investigation of disc scratches
On June 1, 2007, European Commissioner for Consumer Protection Meglena Kuneva, after talking with the producers of "Kassa" and other Dutch consumer organizations, announced that the European Commission would investigate the Xbox scratching problems, and would ask Microsoft for an Xbox replacement program for the whole of Europe. She expected Microsoft's answer within a week. Informal sources now say that Microsoft's response was to deny the problem exists, stating that "the users are to blame". But Kuneva did not react to that response, and 18 months later (4th quarter 2008) the EC's (Meglena Kuneva's) news site was still silent about Microsoft's response, or about the result of the "investigation".

Lawsuit
A man has sued Microsoft claiming the Xbox 360 scratches game discs, saying the consoles are "negligently designed and manufactured." In the lawsuit filed on July 9, 2007 in a Florida federal court, Jorge Brouwer says Microsoft has received thousands of complaints but has not replaced all scratched discs. The lawsuit seeks class action status.

Three law firms in Fort Lauderdale, Florida; Los Angeles, California; and Seattle, Washington are investigating consumer complaints regarding the Xbox 360. The law firms have filed lawsuits in the United States District Court Western District of Washington at Seattle on behalf of a proposed nationwide class of customers who have suffered scratched game discs while using their Xbox 360. The lawsuit seeks class certification and reimbursement for customers for the cost of games damaged by the console; reimbursement for customers who have paid a $20 fee to Microsoft Corporation under a limited disc replacement program offered on ten Microsoft games; repair of consoles free of charge to prevent further disc scratching; and/or reimbursement for customers who have paid for an aftermarket repair solution.

BBC Watchdog investigation of Xbox 360 disc scratches (2009)

On March 23, 2009, the BBC's consumer interest programme Watchdog performed an investigation into how the console scratches its own discs, after Microsoft found no issues with multiple reportedly defective consoles. A sealed test, protected from any outside interference beyond accessing games, found no problems with either console. However, a further test which attempted to simulate normal household vibrations produced a disc scratch on the previously problematic console.

Currently, Microsoft still maintains that it is the user's fault when discs are damaged, because it "makes clear with multiple warnings not to move the console with the disc inside." It also maintains that only a minority of customers are affected by this issue. However, the company did not comment on the lab tests.

Other

November 2006 update
An update patch released on November 1, 2006 was reported to "brick" consoles, rendering them useless. The most obvious issue occurs after the installation of the patch, after which the console immediately reboots and shows an error message. Usually, error code E71 is shown during or directly after the booting animation.

In response to the November 2006 update error that "bricked" his console, a California man filed a class action lawsuit against Microsoft in Washington federal court in early December 2006. The lawsuit seeks $5 million in damages and the free repair of any console rendered unusable by the update. This is the second such lawsuit filed against Microsoft, the first having been filed in December 2005, shortly after the 360's launch.

Following Microsoft's extension of the Xbox 360 warranty to a full year, from the previous 90 days, the California man's attorney confirmed to the Seattle Post Intelligencer that the lawsuit had been resolved under confidential terms.

Video failure

In mid 2007, technology and gaming blogs began reporting about new problems with the Xbox 360 losing video output.Macarthy, Andrew. Another Xbox 360 crisis? Users complain of video failure!, GamerSquad (June 26, 2007). Retrieved July 13, 2008. The problems are characterized by a blank, staticky, or grayscale video output with a proper functioning audio output and no flashing red lights on the console. The complete video failure is sometimes preceded by other graphical glitches such as an irregular saturation of green and/or red colors.

Others have complained about not being able to view certain movies/DVDs on their HDTV using the HDMI cable. This is likely caused by the HDTV being non-HDCP compliant.

Nyko Intercooler
The Nyko Intercooler has been reported to have led to a general hardware failure in a number of consoles, as well as scorching of the power DC input. Microsoft stated that the peripheral drains too much power from the console (the Intercooler power cord is installed between the Xbox 360 power supply and the console itself) and can cause faults to occur,  and stated that consoles fitted with the peripheral will have their warranties null and void. Nyko released an updated Intercooler that uses its own power source. Nyko claims this problem no longer occurs with new versions of this cooler. However, Microsoft still considers it an unlicensed add-on and will void the warranty of machines showing signs of its use. There is no data available to indicate whether the Intercooler really does decrease the chance of hardware failure. However, if the Intercooler fails, it can cause more overheating problems. The Intercooler can also melt itself onto the 360, melt the powercord inside of itself, or make itself extremely hard to remove.

"New Xbox Experience" update issues
On November 19, 2008, Microsoft released the "New Xbox Experience" (NXE).  This update provided streaming Netflix capability and avatars; however, some users have reported the update has caused their consoles to not properly read optical media.  Others have reported that the update has disabled audio through HDMI connections.  A Microsoft spokesperson stated the company is "aware that a handful of Xbox LIVE users are experiencing audio issues, and are diligently monitoring this issue and working towards a solution."  Microsoft released a patch on February 3, 2009 for the HDMI audio issues.

E74 error

An E74 error is indicated when the lower-right quadrant of the ring indicator flashes red and displays an error message in multiple languages: "System Error. Contact Xbox Customer Support", with the code E74 at the bottom. The error is caused by a failure in communication between the GPU and the eDRAM die on the GPU. This is usually due to a failure in the flip chip connection of the dies to the substrate, or a failing GPU or eDRAM.
As of April 14, 2009, the E74 error is now covered by the three-year extended warranty, and customers who previously paid Microsoft for out-of-warranty service to correct the E74 error received a refund.

The E74 error has sometimes been described by many as a "Green Screen of Death" and a "Black Screen of Death" because early versions of these errors had an almost jet-black background with a hue of dark green. Later versions would show a completely jet-black background. Reports of impending Q4 red-light failure stem from users who report an abnormal display with poor, grainy video as well as black dots or artifacts appearing on the screen. Vertical green or red strokes on the screen can also indicate a video system malfunction, preceding the RROD or the E74 error. The Xbox website states on how to fix the error.

Secondary Error Code
Xbox 360 consoles which have a hardware failure will display a secondary error code by blinking a sequence of LEDs when the sync button is held down and the eject button is pressed four times. The number of lights represents a digit from 0 to 3 (4 lights is 0). An error code of 0001 may represent a defect in the power supply, rather than the Xbox itself, or a short within the Xbox, or a blown capacitor.

 See also 
 Microsoft Corp. v. Baker'': U.S. Supreme Court case based on the problems
Blue Screen of Death

References

External links
 

Computer errors
Technical problems
Microsoft criticisms and controversies
Video game controversies